Gro Hillestad Thune (born 19 January 1943) is a Norwegian jurist and politician for the Labour Party.

Born in Oslo, she served as a deputy representative to the Norwegian Parliament from Akershus during the term 1977–1981.

She chaired the Norwegian Consumer Council from 1977 to 1984. She was a member of the board of NAVF from 1980 to 1982 and the National Institute for Consumer Research from 1980 to 1984, and chaired the board of Radiumhospitalet from 1980 to 1985.

A lawyer by profession, she was a member of the European Commission of Human Rights from 1982 to 1998.

References

1943 births
Living people
Labour Party (Norway) politicians
Deputy members of the Storting
Akershus politicians
Directors of government agencies of Norway
Members of the European Commission of Human Rights
Norwegian women lawyers
20th-century Norwegian lawyers